"White Light" is a song by English singer George Michael. It was released to radio on 2 July 2012, in order to commemorate the 30-year anniversary since his first single (co-written by Andrew Ridgeley) entered the British charts in 1982. The song received its debut live performance (alongside "Freedom! '90") at the 2012 Summer Olympics closing ceremony on 12 August 2012 and subsequently entered the UK Singles Chart at number 15. This was his final original song released before his death in December 2016.

Chart performance
On 19 August 2012, the song entered the UK Singles Chart at number 15, becoming his last top 40 hit in his lifetime, following his death on 25 December 2016. The song has also charted in Belgium, Germany, the Netherlands, and Switzerland.

Track listing

"White Light" (EP)
 "White Light" – 4:35
 "Song to the Siren" – 3:33
 "White Light" (Voodoo Sonics Remix) – 6:58
 "White Light" (Kinky Roland Remix) – 6:47

"White Light" (The Remixes)
 "White Light" (Kinky Roland Remix) – 6:47
 "White Light" (Steven Redant & Phil Romano Divine Vox Remix) – 7:12
 "White Light" (Stereogamous Bath House Mix) – 5:05
 "White Light" (Voodoo Sonics Remix) – 6:58
 "White Light" (Jackman & Thomas Remix) – 6:08
 "White Light" (David Kay Remix) – 4:01

Charts

Certifications

References

2012 singles
Songs written by George Michael
George Michael songs
Song recordings produced by George Michael
Island Records singles
2012 songs